The 1986 Montreal municipal election took place on November 9, 1986, to elect a mayor and city councillors in Montreal, Quebec, Canada. Longtime mayor Jean Drapeau did not seek re-election, and Jean Doré from the opposition Montreal Citizens' Movement (MCM) was elected to the position by a significant margin.

Elections also took place in suburban Montreal communities.

Results (incomplete)
Party colours do not indicate affiliation with or resemblance to a provincial or a federal party.

Results in suburban communities (incomplete)

Dorval
All of Dorval's serving representatives were re-elected without opposition.

Source: Elizabeth Thompson, "Dorval mayor, councillors returned by acclamation," Montreal Gazette, October 23, 1986, I7.

Montréal-Nord (November 2)

Sources: "Laid-back Ryan isn't worried by Nov. 2 elections," 16 October 1986, p. 6; "Montreal North councillor quits," Montreal Gazette, October 23, 1986, H3; "Results of council elections in 18 Montreal-area municipalities," Montreal Gazette, November 3, 1986, A8.

Saint-Leonard

Subsequent by-elections in suburban communities
Anjou

Results in other Montreal-area communities (incomplete)

Longueuil
The governing Parti municipal de Longueuil was returned to office with a landslide majority. Party leader Jacques Finet was re-elected to a second term as mayor, and the party won all nineteen seats on council.

Winning candidates are listed in boldface.

Source: Le Parti municipal de Longueuil: Jacques Finet, l'innovateur, Société historique et culturelle du Marigot, accessed February 19, 2014. Some minor corrections to the names of some candidates are taken from "Final tally shows size of victory in Longueuil," Montreal Gazette, November 6, 1986, V1.

Jacques Finet resigned as mayor on April 16, 1987, to take a vice-president's job at Hydro-Quebec. A by-election to choose his successor was held on May 30, 1987.

Source: James Mennie, "Ferland whips ex-MP to win Longueuil mayoralty," Montreal Gazette, June 1, 1987, A3.

References

1986 Quebec municipal elections
Municipal elections in Montreal
1980s in Montreal
1986 in Quebec